En blandt mange is a Danish 1961 drama film written and directed by Astrid Henning-Jensen.

Plot
Bo is a 17 year old boy who lives with his mother in Aalborg after the divorce of his parents while his architect father lives in Copenhagen. On a visit to Copenhagen he meets a young girl at his father's workplace and immediately falls in love with her. It later turns out that it is his father's new girl friend.

Cast
 Ole Wegener as Bo
 Erno Müller as Bo's father
 Elsa Kourani as Bo's mother
 Marina Lund as Hanne
 Jørgen Sindballe as The painter
 Paul Hagen as The painter's friend
 Lili Lani as The girl in the street
 Søren Weiss as The police officer
 Poul Müller as Læreren
 Ole Wisborg as advertisement photographer
 Kirsten Arnvig as Lis

Production
The film was produced by ASA Film. Several scenes were shot on location in Copenhagen. Locations used in the film include Flamingo Bar, Galerie Toulouse, Ole Haslunds Hus (Amagertorv 14, Palace Hotel and Skindbuksen.

References

1961 films
1961 drama films
Danish drama films
Danish black-and-white films
1960s Danish-language films
Films set in Copenhagen
Films directed by Astrid Henning-Jensen